KHCB-FM (105.7 MHz) is an American radio station broadcasting a Christian radio format.

Licensed to Houston, Texas, United States, the station serves the Houston area. The station is owned by Houston Christian Broadcasters, Inc. Since 1962, this station has offered Christian programming on a noncommercial basis. KHCB is the flagship station for a network of 39 stations.

Programming
KHCB-FM's programming consists of Christian music and Christian talk and teaching programs including; In Touch with Charles Stanley, Insight for Living with Chuck Swindoll, The Urban Alternative with Tony Evans, Back to the Bible, Revive our Hearts with Nancy Leigh DeMoss, Truth for Life with Alistair Begg, Love Worth Finding with Adrian Rogers, Breakpoint with Eric Metaxas and John Stonestreet, and Turning Point with David Jeremiah.

Network of stations
KHCB-FM is also carried on many other full powered stations that are owned by Houston Christian Broadcasters, Inc., as well as many low powered translators.

Repeaters

Translators

References

External links

KHCB Radio Network
Houston 105.7 FM shows coverage area

Christianity in Houston
Radio stations established in 1962
HCB-FM
1962 establishments in Texas